Melvine Deba  (born 8 January 1998) is a French handballer who plays for Chambray Touraine Handball.

Achievements  
French Cup:
Finalist: 2017

EHF Junior European Championship:
Gold Medalist: 2017

References
 

     
1998 births
Living people
Handball players from Paris
French female handball players